The 1986 KFK competitions in Ukraine were part of the 1986 Soviet KFK competitions that were conducted in the Soviet Union. It was 22nd season of the KFK in Ukraine since its introduction in 1964. The winner eventually qualified to the 1987 Soviet Second League.

First stage

Group 1

Group 2

Group 3

Group 4

Group 5

Group 6

Final
The finals took place in Mukacheve, Zakarpattia Oblast.

Ukrainian Football Amateur League seasons
Amateur